The women's 35 kilometres race walk at the 2022 European Athletics Championships took place at the streets of Munich on 16 August.

Records

Schedule

Results
The start on 8:30.

References

Race Walk 35 W
Racewalking at the European Athletics Championships
Euro